John White Webster (May 20, 1793 – August 30, 1850) was an American professor of chemistry and geology at Harvard Medical College. In 1850, he was convicted of murder in the Parkman–Webster murder case and hanged.

Biography
Born in Boston, Massachusetts, Webster was from a well-connected family: his grandfather was a successful merchant; his mother, Hannah (White) Webster, was a Leverett; his wife's sister married into the Prescotts; he was friends with the Shaws;, and his Unitarian pastor was the Reverend Francis Parkman Sr. (brother of George). Webster, indulged as a child and pampered in youth, had a petulant and fussy disposition, but was known for his kindly nature.

He graduated from Harvard College in 1811. In 1814, he was among the founders of the Linnaean Society of New England, and was appointed cabinet-keeper of the society's quickly growing collection of specimens in Joy's Buildings in Boston. He graduated from Harvard Medical College in 1815.

Around 1815, he went to London for further study. At Guy's Hospital, he was a surgeon’s pupil, a physician’s pupil, and a surgeon's dresser. He then went to São Miguel Island in the Azores (1817–18). There, he practiced medicine; published his first book; and met the daughter of Thomas Hickling the American vice-consul on the island, Harriet Fredrica Hickling, whom he married on May 16, 1818, with whom he fathered four daughters. After returning to Boston, he entered private medical practice, but a lack of success prompted him to change careers. Webster was elected a Fellow of the American Academy of Arts and Sciences, in 1823.

Harvard lecturer
In 1824, Webster was appointed a lecturer of chemistry, mineralogy, and geology at the Harvard Medical College, and three years later he was promoted to the Erving professorship. In Boston he lived on Common Street.

Webster was a popular lecturer at Harvard Medical College, being described by Oliver Wendell Holmes Sr. as "pleasant in the lecture room, rather nervous and excitable." Many of Webster's class-room demonstrations involved some of the latest chemical discoveries. Cohen (1950) particularly noted Webster's demonstrating Michael Faraday's liquefaction of the common gasses and Webster even made solid carbon dioxide among his demonstrations. Edward Everett Hale reminisced about the student-based Davy Club at Harvard: "Dr. Webster... gave us the most good-natured and kindly assistance." George F. Hoar mentioned that Webster's lectures were "tedious", at least for a non-chemistry major, but that: "[Webster] was known to the students by the sobriquet of Sky-rocket jack, owing to his great interest in having some fireworks at the illumination when President Everett, his former classmate, was inaugurated. There was no person less likely to commit such a bloody and cruel crime as that for which he was accused." Many anecdotes suggest his class-room demonstrations were livened by pyrotechnic drama, although on one occasion the President of Harvard warned that some of them were dangerous if an accident occurred.

Reports written after the trial criticized his teaching ability: for instance, The Boston Daily Bee described him as "tolerated rather than respected, and has only retained his position on account of its comparative insignificance. As a lecturer he was dull and common-place and while the students took tickets to his lectures, they did not generally attend them."

Webster had financial problems. The family had been forced to give up a mansion he had built in Cambridge, although they were leasing a respectable but not grand house in 1849. He was in debt to a number of friends, as his salary and meager lecture earnings could not cover his expenses.

Henry Wadsworth Longfellow attested to his macabre streak in an anecdote relating how at one dinner at the Webster home, the host amazed his guests by lowering the lights, fitting a noose around his own neck, and lolling his head forward, tongue protruding, over a bowl of blazing chemicals, to give a ghastly imitation of a man being hanged.

He wrote A Description of the Island of St. Michael (1821), was associate editor of the Boston Journal of Philosophy and the Arts (1824–26), compiled A Manual of Chemistry (1826), and brought out editions of Andrew Fyfe's Elements of Chemistry (1827) and Justus von Liebig's Animal Chemistry or Organic Chemistry (1841). Noted mineralogist and Harvard Professor, Clifford Frondel appraised Webster's books as "creditable" and had praise for them.

Parkman–Webster murder case

On November 23, 1849, Dr. George Parkman was murdered. After an investigation, Dr. John White Webster was accused of the murder on January 26, 1850. The murder trial was the 19th century equivalent of the "Case of the Century" and has been widely cited as one of the earliest uses of forensic evidence to identify a body.  As the remains had been partially cremated, dental evidence and bone fragments were used to verify that they were Dr. Parkman's. The case was widely publicized in newspapers, particularly as Webster was also a professor at Harvard University. Webster was known to be in debt to Parkman and there had been arguments when Parkman pressed Webster for money.

After a lengthy trial, where, under current Massachusetts law, Webster could not testify in his own defense, the jury was instructed by the principal judge, a close relative of the victim, that they "Must come back with a guilty verdict." The judge also issued one of the first ever “reasonable doubt” instructions to the jury, however. The most important factor about the case is that a great body of documentary testimony was either not used by Webster's lawyers or was denied admission into his defense. Helen Thomson  wrote utilizing mostly the extensively re-written court testimony and newspaper accounts. Her book partially perpetuated the notion that Webster was guilty, although, she too had reservations about the testimony and verdict. Robert Sullivan, the chief criminal prosecutor for the State of Massachusetts, reviewed the entire documentary records of the Webster case and was convinced that Webster was innocent and that the murderer was actually Webster's accuser, Ephraim Littlefield: "The verdict not only was unwarranted, but appears to have been unduly guided by the judge's charge to the jury."

Webster was sentenced to death, was taken to Boston's Leverett Street Jail on August 30, 1850, and publicly hanged.

In popular culture
The Parkman–Webster murder case was dramatized in the CBS radio program Crime Classics on July 13, 1953 in the episode entitled "The Terrible Deed of John White Webster". Webster was portrayed in this program by Jay Novello.  The case was also discussed at length in the first episode of television programme Catching History's Criminals: The Forensics Story, focussing on identity. The series was produced by the BBC and the Open University in 2015. The case was also the subject of one of the 'Famous Trials' series of books edited by George Dilnot (qv) and published in England by Geoffrey Bles in 1928.

See also 
 Daniel Davis Jr. - electrical device inventor

References

External links
 WorldCat

1793 births
1850 deaths
People from Boston
Educators from Massachusetts
Harvard Medical School alumni
Harvard Medical School faculty
19th century in Boston
People convicted of murder by Massachusetts
People executed by Massachusetts by hanging
American people convicted of murder
Fellows of the American Academy of Arts and Sciences
19th-century executions by the United States
Executed people from Massachusetts
People executed for murder
19th-century executions of American people
People from Suffolk County, Massachusetts
Harvard College alumni
1849 murders in the United States